Dolichoderus decollatus is a species of ant in the subfamily Dolichoderinae. Described by Smith in 1858, the species is found in many countries of South America, including Bolivia, Brazil, Colombia, Ecuador, French Guiana, Guyana, Peru, Suriname and Trinidad and Tobago.

References

Dolichoderus
Hymenoptera of South America
Insects described in 1858